Heterixalus punctatus is a species of frogs in the family Hyperoliidae endemic to Madagascar. Its natural habitats are subtropical or tropical moist lowland forests, swamps, freshwater marshes, intermittent freshwater marshes, arable land, rural gardens, heavily degraded former forests, ponds, irrigated land, and seasonally flooded agricultural land.

References

Heterixalus
Endemic frogs of Madagascar
Taxonomy articles created by Polbot
Amphibians described in 1994